Isak Arne Refvik (born 25 December 1956 in Bergen) is a Norwegian association football coach and former player. He scored 86 goals in 407 games for Viking FK, and played in one season for Scottish team Hibernian together with fellow Norwegian Svein Mathisen. Refvik was capped seven times by Norway.

Isak Arne Refvik became league champion for Viking in 1979 and 1982, and helped win the cup title against SK Haugar in 1979.

References

External links 

Isaac Refvik, www.ihibs.co.uk

1956 births
Living people
Norwegian footballers
Norway international footballers
Viking FK players
Hibernian F.C. players
Eliteserien players
Scottish Football League players
Norwegian expatriate footballers
Expatriate footballers in Scotland
Association football forwards
Footballers from Bergen